The Sher-e-Hind (Tiger of India) was the highest military decoration awarded by the Imperial Japanese supported Azad Hind Government, established in Singapore in 1943.  First instituted by Subhas Chandra Bose in Nazi Germany, this award was later also awarded to troops of the Indian National Army in South East Asia. The award could be conferred with swords for valour in combat, and without swords for non-combat awards. At least three awards were made, to Captain Baru Singh, Captain Kunwal Singh and one to Capt Ganeshi Lal.

See also
Indian National Army
Indische Legion

External links

External links
Awards
History

Military awards and decorations of Azad Hind